Amastridae is a taxonomic family of small, air-breathing, land snails, terrestrial pulmonate gastropod mollusks in the superfamily Pupilloidea.

Distribution
This family is endemic to the Hawaiian Islands.

Genera
Subfamily Amastrinae Pilsbry, 1910
 Amastra H. Adams & A. Adams, 1855
 Carelia H. Adams & A. Adams, 1855
 Cyclamastra
 Kauaia
 Laminella L. Pfeiffer, 1854
 Planamastra Hyatt & Pilsbry, 1911
 Tropidoptera Ancey, 1889
Subfamily Leptachatininae Cockerell, 1913
 Armsia Hyatt & Pilsbry, 1911
 Leptachatina A. A. Gould, 1847
 Pauahia C. M. Cooke, 1910
Genera brought into synonymy
 Carinella L. Pfeiffer, 1875: synonym of Amastra (Kauaia) Sykes, 1900 represented as Amastra H. Adams & A. Adams, 1855
 Helicamastra Pilsbry & Vanatta, 1905: synonym of Tropidoptera Ancey, 1889
 Pterodiscus Pilsbry, 1893: synonym of Tropidoptera Ancey, 1889

References

 Bank, R. A. (2017). Classification of the Recent terrestrial Gastropoda of the World. Last update: July 16th, 2017